On 25 October 2019, a Russian soldier shot ten of his colleagues, killing eight of them, in Gorny, Zabaykalsky Krai, Russia. The gunman was later identified as 20-year-old Ramil Shamsutdinov.

Shooting 
Two of the eight killed were officers and the rest were enlisted men. The shooting took place at 18:20 (UTC+09:00), right after Pvt. Ramil Shamsutdinov had received an AK-74 assault rifle. Shamsutdinov fired 26 rounds of the 30 in the magazine. A Spetsnaz response-team arrived two minutes after the shooting. Shamsutdinov immediately surrendered without any resistance.

Investigation 
The sole suspect was Pvt. Ramil Salengalovich Shamsutdinov (born 1999), a resident of the Vagay village, Tyumen Oblast, and son of a retired military commander. The Chita military court arrested Ramil Shamsutdinov.

Motive
The Russian Ministry of Defence attributed the events to Shamsutdinov suffering a nervous breakdown. However, Shamsutdinov's father alleges that severe, ritualized abuse of new recruits at the hands of officers and older soldiers drove his son to carry out the shooting, saying that his son had told him "I’m sorry father, I couldn’t have done otherwise. Either they’d kill me or I’d kill them," and that Ramil did not regret his “deliberate” actions. Shamsutdinov testified that he faced physical abuse and threats of rape.

Sentencing
In January 2021 Shamsutdinov was sentenced to 24½ years in prison. At the time of his sentencing the Defence ministry had accepted that he was subjected to hazing prior to the shooting. Some victims' families criticized the sentence, arguing that it is too short.

See also 
 List of mass shootings in Russia and Soviet Union
 Dedovshchina

References 

2019 murders in Russia
2019 mass shootings in Asia
21st-century military history of Russia
Deaths by firearm in Russia
Mass shootings in Russia
Massacres in Russia
October 2019 crimes in Asia
October 2019 events in Russia
Workplace shootings
Zabaykalsky Krai